Glyphipterix leucoplaca is a species of sedge moth in the genus Glyphipterix. It was described by Alfred Jefferis Turner in 1913. It is found in Australia, including Queensland.

References

Moths described in 1913
Glyphipterigidae
Moths of Australia